Susan Jane Nye, Baroness Nye (born 17 May 1955) is the former Director of Government Relations and former diary secretary to ex-British prime minister Gordon Brown. In May 2010 it was announced that Nye would be named a life peer in the Dissolution Honours List. On 19 July 2010 she became a Labour Party Peer, as Baroness Nye, of Lambeth in the London Borough of Lambeth.

Early life
She was born at King's College Hospital. She initially lived on Leander Road in Brixton. She went to a local primary school. Her father left the home and moved to South Africa, and her mother moved to Leigh-on-Sea. She passed the eleven-plus and went to Westcliff High School for Girls.

Career
Nye worked as a civil servant before becoming an employee of the Labour Party. She worked for Michael Foot's office when he became Labour Party leader. Her friendship with Tony Blair's political secretary Anji Hunter provided a back channel between the warring factions during Blair's premiership. 

Nye is the person to whom Gordon Brown refers in the "Bigotgate" incident during the 2010 general election campaign.

In The Deal, Nye was portrayed by Joanna Scanlan.

Personal life
Nye married Gavyn Davies, the former BBC chairman and former Goldman Sachs worker, in Islington, north London, in August 1989. They live in Wandsworth, having moved there to give their daughter the opportunity to attend a better school. The couple also have two sons and a further home in Croyde, Devon.

References

Sources
 Graeme Wilson, Brown's Team in Place for March on No. 10, The Daily Telegraph, 12 May 2007.
 Martin Kettle, The Granita guarantee decoded, The Guardian, 6 June 2003.
BBC, Dissolution Honours, 28 May 2010.

1955 births
Living people
Labour Party (UK) life peers
Life peeresses created by Elizabeth II
People from Brixton
British special advisers
People from Leigh-on-Sea
People educated at Westcliff High School for Girls
Labour Party (UK) officials